Minuscule 191 (in the Gregory-Aland numbering), ε 224 (Soden), is a Greek minuscule manuscript of the New Testament, on parchment. Palaeographically it has been assigned to the 12th century. It has marginalia.

Description 

The codex contains a complete text of the four Gospels on 180 elegant parchment leaves (size ). The text is written in one column per page, in 27 lines per page, in black ink.

Text 

The Greek text of the codex is a representative of the Byzantine text-type. Hermann von Soden assigned it to the textual family Kx. Aland did not place it in any Category.

According to the Claremont Profile Method it belongs to the textual cluster M1326 along with the manuscripts 444, 1326, 1396, 2521. It is related to the cluster M106.

History 

The manuscript was examined by Bandini, Birch, Scholz, and Burgon. C. R. Gregory saw it in 1886.

It is currently housed at the Laurentian Library (Plutei. VI. 29), at Florence.

See also 
 List of New Testament minuscules
 Biblical manuscript
 Textual criticism

References

Further reading 

 

Greek New Testament minuscules
12th-century biblical manuscripts